Iddefjord ( or Idde Fjord)) is a classic fjord with a narrow watercourse and steep natural formations on both sides. It runs along the Norwegian-Swedish border from the Singlefjord. The Iddefjord separates the province of Bohuslän in the county of Västra Götaland in Sweden from the municipality of Halden in the county of Østfold in Norway. It opens to the Skagerrak via the Svinesund and Hvaler archipelago (a cluster of classic skerries). The outermost stretch is called the Ringdalsfjord, but from the point where it makes a sharp bend and further south, it is called the Iddefjord. Like several other fjords, it was named after a part of its coast, in this case the parish of Idd.

References

Fjords of Viken
Halden
Fjords of Sweden
Norway–Sweden border
International fjords
Landforms of Västra Götaland County